The 2023 International League T20, also known as the DP World ILT20 2023 for sponsorship reasons, was the inaugural season of the International League T20 (ILT20), the top-level professional 20-over cricket league in United Arab Emirates, organized by the Emirates Cricket Board (ECB). In June 2022, it was confirmed that the season will be played in January and February 2023. The official fixtures were announced on November 29 with the League set to run from January 13 to February 12.

In the final, Gulf Giants defeated Desert Vipers by 7 wickets to win the inaugural title.

Squads

  * Supportive Players.

Venues

Points table

The top 4 teams qualified for the playoffs.
  Advances to Qualifier 1.
  Advances to Eliminator.

League stage

Playoffs

Qualifier 1

Eliminator

Qualifier 2

Final

References

External links
 League home at ESPN Cricinfo

Cricket in the United Arab Emirates
International League T20